The Chief Veterinary Officer of Hungary, as a chief veterinary officer, is the supervisor of the National Food Chain Safety Office, and in general, the governmental veterinary services including animal health, animal protection and welfare and food chain safety control. Besides organizing and operating veterinary public health, he plays a significant role in international agricultural and trade affairs, in which the animal health and food safety status usually an important issue. His responsibilities are detailed in the law XLVI of 2008 on food chain and its authority control.

List 
This is a list of the chief veterinary officers of Hungary in chronological order:

 1945-1948: Dr. Kolgyári László
 1948-1953: Dr. Kádár Tibor
 1953-1953: Dr. Láng Miklós
 1953-1963: Dr. Pusztai Oszkár
 1963-1973: Dr. Kádár Tibor
 1973-1978: Dr. Dénes Lajos
 1978-1990: Dr. Glózik András
 1990-1992: Dr. Simor Ferenc
 1992-1995: Dr. Nagy Attila
 1995-1996: Dr. Fehérvári Tamás
 1996-2000: Dr. Bálint Tibor
 2000-2002: Dr. Németh Antal
 2002-2005: Dr. Bálint Tibor
 2005-2010: Dr. Süth Miklós
 2010-2014: Dr. Kardeván Endre
 2014-2022: Dr. Bognár Lajos
 2022- :Dr. Pásztor Szabolcs

References 

Hungarian veterinarians
Veterinary professions
1945 establishments in Hungary
Hungarian health officials